Tilda Bogue is a stream in the U.S. state of Mississippi.

Tilda Bogue is a name derived from the Choctaw language purported to mean "palmetto creek".

References

Rivers of Mississippi
Rivers of Madison County, Mississippi
Mississippi placenames of Native American origin